Spatalistis nephritica is a species of moth of the family Tortricidae. It is found on Sulawesi.

References

Moths described in 1966
nephritica
Moths of Indonesia
Taxa named by Józef Razowski